John Alexander is a British director of television drama who grew up in the East Durham Coal Field and joined the BBC as a post graduate trainee. He produced a number of documentaries before directing drama. His works include Quirke, The 7.39, Sense and Sensibility, Small Island, Exile, and One Child.

Small Island won an International Emmy for Best Mini-Series, and Sense and Sensibility won the Magnolia Best Director Prize at the Shanghai International Film Festival. Exile was BAFTA-nominated for Best Director Fiction, and more recently, One Child was RTS-nominated for Best Director Fiction.

Alexander's most recent work includes directing all six episodes of the new ITV show Belgravia, written by Downton Abbey creator Julian Fellowes and adapted from his own best-selling novel of the same name.

External links

 John Alexander website

British television directors
Year of birth missing (living people)
Living people
People from Peterlee